Samir Fazli (born 22 April 1991) is a Macedonian professional footballer who plays as a striker for Turan in the Kazakhstan Premier League.

Early life
Born in Skopje, Fazli lived in Canada for some time, attending Jasper Place High School in Edmonton, Alberta prior to his return to Skopje in 2007.

Club career
Fazli began his career in the youth ranks of FK Makedonija Gjorče Petrov, then had trial for Sampdoria at 16 years old, but a bid by them was considered far to low according to FK Makedonija's club president.
He went on trial with Dutch-side Heerenveen, On 13 March 2009, due to age restrictions, a deal could not be made for his move to Heerenveen, but he would remain in Skopje and continue to play for his club there. Heerenveen's scout Dragan Putevski stated that "he's a big deal", adding that it was his best find to date. Fazli was finally signed by the club for €200,000 on a contract that will keep him there until 2014.
Fazli scored his first goal for Heerenveen on 19 March 2010. He came on as a substitute in the 81st minute and scored in the 90th minute as his team won 4–1 over NEC. He was released by SC Heerenveen in 2014 after his contract expired.

International career
Fazli also a regular for the Macedonia U-21s – he played his first game on 11 February 2009 against the Croatia U-21s. He was a member of the U-17 squad before his call-up to the U-21s.

He made his senior debut for Macedonia in an August 2011 friendly match away against Azerbaijan and has earned a total of 7 caps, scoring no goals. His final international was a June 2013 friendly against Norway in Oslo.

Personal life
Fazli holds passports from both Albania and Macedonia.

References

External links
 
 Voetbal International profile 
 Profile at MacedonianFootball 
 

1991 births
Living people
Footballers from Skopje
Albanian footballers from North Macedonia
Canadian people of Macedonian descent
Association football forwards
Macedonian footballers
FK Makedonija Gjorče Petrov players
SC Heerenveen players
Helmond Sport players
FC Wil players
NK Rudeš players
KF Shkëndija players
FC Turan players
Eredivisie players
Eerste Divisie players
Croatian Football League players
Macedonian First Football League players
Macedonian expatriate footballers
Expatriate footballers in the Netherlands
Macedonian expatriate sportspeople in the Netherlands
Expatriate footballers in Switzerland
Macedonian expatriate sportspeople in Switzerland
Expatriate footballers in Croatia
Macedonian expatriate sportspeople in Croatia
Expatriate footballers in Kazakhstan
Macedonian expatriate sportspeople in Kazakhstan
North Macedonia international footballers
North Macedonia under-21 international footballers